The Wonnangatta River is a perennial river of the Mitchell River catchment, located in the Alpine and East Gippsland regions of the Australian state of Victoria.

Features and location
The river flows generally south by east, in a highly meandering course, joined by eleven tributaries including the Dry, Humffray, Moroka, Wongungarra and Dargo rivers, before reaching its confluence with the Wentworth River and Swamp Creek to form the Mitchell River north of the Mitchell River National Park, in the Shire of East Gippsland. The river descends  over its  course.

At the locality of Riverford, the Dargo Road traverses the river.

Etymology

In the Aboriginal Braiakaulung dialect of the Gunai language, there are two variant names for the Wonnangatta River; Wontwun; and WonnangaUa. Their meanings are not clearly defined.

See also

 County of Wonnangatta
 List of rivers in Australia
 Wonnangatta Station

References

External links
 
 

East Gippsland catchment
Rivers of Gippsland (region)
Rivers of Hume (region)
Victorian Alps